"The Rain (Supa Dupa Fly)" is the debut solo single by American rapper Missy "Misdemeanor" Elliott. It was written and composed by Don Bryant, Bernard "Bernie" Miller, Elliott, and producer Timbaland for her debut album Supa Dupa Fly (1997) and contains a sample of Ann Peebles' 1973 single "I Can't Stand the Rain", whose lyrics serve as the chorus.

The song was released to US radio stations on May 20, 1997, and the Hype Williams-directed video was released to video shows starting June 3, 1997. The song entered the Hot R&B Airplay chart in mid-June, and peaked at number 6 the week of August 9, 1997. It peaked at number 51 on the Hot 100 Airplay chart the following week. It was released as the album's lead single on July 2, 1997, and reached the top twenty in the United Kingdom and New Zealand. The song's moans are used as a sample in Method Man & Redman's "The ?"

Critical reception
Larry Flick from Billboard wrote, "Elliott commits more than a misdemeanor with her first solo single, "The Rain". Having scored a handful of hits writing and producing for such acts as Aaliyah, 702, SWV and Ginuwine, Elliott attempts to hide the fact that she was lazy with her own lyrics and depended on a Timbaland beat to save her. The result is a little of her infamous wordplay atop an ineffectual bass, snare, and drum beat. One can only hope that she puts more time and effort into her upcoming album, "Hit 'Em With The Heat", as we don't want to see such a rising star burn out so fast." VH1 ranked the song 99th on VH1's 100 Greatest Songs of the '90s. In 2010 Pitchfork Media included the song at number 33 on their Top 200 Tracks of the 90s. In 2000, "The Rain (Supa Dupa Fly)" was named the fourth-best single of 1997 by The Village Voices annual-year end Pazz & Jop critics' poll. In 2021, it was listed at No. 453 on Rolling Stone's 500 Greatest Songs of All Time.

Music video
The breakout music video for the song was the first of Missy's career directed by Hype Williams. The video was designed by Ron Norsworthy.  The most notable aspect of the video is the patent leather blow up suit, which resembles an inflated trash bag that Missy wears during a fisheye lens shot. Timbaland, Tamara Johnson-George of SWV, Yo-Yo, Lil' Kim, Total, 702, Da Brat, Lil' Cease, and Sean Combs all make cameos. The video was nominated for Best Rap Video at the 1997 MTV Video Music Awards but lost to The Notorious B.I.G.'s "Hypnotize".

Legacy
The song was used in a 2016 Coca-Cola commercial featuring professional golfer Jordan Spieth. At the 2019 MTV Video Music Awards, Elliot performed a medley of her songs, including "The Rain (Supa Dupa Fly)".

Formats and track listings

"The Rain (Supa Dupa Fly)" (Radio Edit) - 4:05
"The Rain (Supa Dupa Fly)" (Desert Eagles Discs Remix - Radio Edit Master) - 3:57
"The Rain (Supa Dupa Fly)" (Instrumental) - 4:09

German 12" Remixes
Side A
"The Rain (Supa Dupa Fly)" (Club 100 Version) - 5:10
"The Rain (Supa Dupa Fly)" (Radio Edit) - 3:46
Side B
"The Rain (Supa Dupa Fly)" (House Version) - 7:25

German CD Maxi-Single
"The Rain (Supa Dupa Fly)" (Radio Edit) - 3:59
"The Rain (Supa Dupa Fly)" (Desert Eagle Discs Remix - Radio Edit Master) - 3:53
"The Rain (Supa Dupa Fly)" (Desert Eagle Discs Remix - Master) - 4:32
"The Rain (Supa Dupa Fly)" (Desert Eagle Discs Remix - Beat & All Vocals) - 4:20
"The Rain (Supa Dupa Fly)" (Desert Eagle Discs Remix - A cappella) - 4:04
"The Rain (Supa Dupa Fly)" (Instrumental Version) - 4:11
"The Rain (Supa Dupa Fly)" (A cappella version) - 4:08

U.S. 12-inch Promo
Side A
"Supa Dupa Fly (The Rain)" (Album Version) - 4:11
"Supa Dupa Fly (The Rain)" (Instrumental) - 4:11
Side B
"Supa Dupa Fly (The Rain)" (Radio Edit) - 3:59
"Supa Dupa Fly (The Rain)" (A cappella) - 4:11

U.S. 12-inch Single
Side A
"The Rain (Supa Dupa Fly)" (Radio Edit) - 3:59
"The Rain (Supa Dupa Fly)" (Instrumental Version) - 4:11
"The Rain (Supa Dupa Fly)" (A cappella version) - 4:08
Side B
"The Rain (Supa Dupa Fly)" (Desert Eagles Discs Remix - Master) - 4:32
"The Rain (Supa Dupa Fly)" (Desert Eagles Discs Remix - A cappella) - 4:04
"The Rain (Supa Dupa Fly)" (Desert Eagles Discs Remix - Beat & All Vocals) - 4:20

U.S. CD Maxi-Single
"The Rain (Supa Dupa Fly)" (Radio Edit) - 4:05
"The Rain (Supa Dupa Fly)" (Desert Eagles Discs Remix - Radio Edit Master) - 3:57
"The Rain (Supa Dupa Fly)" (Instrumental) - 4:09

Charts

References

External links
 

1997 debut singles
Missy Elliott songs
Music videos directed by Hype Williams
Song recordings produced by Timbaland
Songs written by Missy Elliott
Songs written by Timbaland
Elektra Records singles
1997 songs
Alternative hip hop songs
Downtempo songs